Pedro Hurtado de Mendoza (1578, Balmaseda – November 10, 1641, Madrid) was a Basque scholastic philosopher and theologian.

Philosophical work
He was a teacher of theology and philosophy in Valladolid and he occupied a chair at the University of Salamanca.

Hurtado belonged to the third generation of Jesuit scholars and initiated the shift from more realist positions of Francisco Suárez and Gabriel Vásquez towards conceptualism, characteristic of that generation. His conceptualist tendencies were further developed by his pupils Rodrigo de Arriaga and Francisco Oviedo.

Works 
 Disputationes a Summulis ad Metaphysicam (Valladolid 1615) reprinted as: Disputationes ad universam philosophiam (Lyon 1617) and as: Universa philosophia (Lyon 1624). 
 Disputationes scholasticae et morales de tribus virtutibus theologicis. De fide volumen secundum, Salamanca,  1631.
 Disputationes scholasticae et morales de spe et charitate, volumen secundum, Salamanca, 1631.
 Disputationes de Deo homine, sive de Incarnatione Filii Dei, Antwerpen, 1634.

See also 
 Thomism
 School of Salamanca

References

Further reading 
 
 Daniel D. Novotný, “The Historical Non-Significance of Suárez’s Theory of Beings of Reason: A Lesson From Hurtado”. In Suárez's Metaphysics in its Systematic and Historical Context, ed. Lukáš Novák, Berlin: De Gruyter, 2014, 183-207. 
 Jacob Schmutz, "Hurtado et son double. La querelle des images mentales dans la scolastique moderne", dans: Lambros Couloubaritsis, Antonino Mazzù (eds.), Questions sur l'intentionnalité, Bruxelles: Ousia, 2007, 157-232.

External links 
 Pedro Hurtado de Mendoza at the Biblioteca Virtual Ignacio Larramendi (last actualization 13.01.2009.)
 Scholasticon by Jacob Schmutz

1578 births
1651 deaths
Spanish philosophers
17th-century philosophers
17th-century Spanish Roman Catholic theologians
Spanish scholars
Academic staff of the University of Salamanca
Jesuit philosophers